Diógenes Vergara (10 August 1970 – 9 February 2021) was a Panamanian politician who served as a Deputy for Partido Revolucionario Democrático. He was shot and killed by gunmen in February 2021.

References

1970 births
2021 deaths
Panamanian politicians
Place of birth missing
Date of birth missing
Democratic Revolutionary Party politicians
Members of the National Assembly (Panama)
Deaths by firearm in Panama